The 2022–23 Northern Football League season is the 125th in the history of the Northern Football League, a football competition in England. The league operates two divisions in the English football league system, Division One at step 5, and Division Two at step 6.

The allocations for Steps 5 and 6 this season were announced by the Football Association on 12 May 2022, and are subject to appeals.

Division One
At the end of the 2021–22 season, four teams left the division:
 Billingham Town – relegated to Division Two
 Consett – promoted to the Northern Premier League Division One East
 North Shields – promoted to the Northern Premier League Division One East
 Ryhope Colliery Welfare – resigned from the Northern League post-allocations

The remaining sixteen teams, together with the following four, formed Division One for 2022–23:
 Carlisle City – promoted from Division Two
 Heaton Stannington – promoted from Division Two
 Pickering Town – relegated from the Northern Premier League Division One East
 Tow Law Town – promoted from Division Two

Division One table

Stadia and locations

Division Two
At the end of the 2021–22 season, four teams left the division:
 Carlisle City – promoted to Division One
 Durham City – relegated to the Wearside League
 Heaton Stannington – promoted to Division One
 Tow Law Town – promoted to Division One

The remaining seventeen teams, together with the following four, formed Division One for 2022–23:
 Billingham Town – relegated from Division One
 Boro Rangers – promoted from the North Riding League
 Chester-le-Street United – promoted from the Wearside League
 Prudhoe Youth Club – promoted from the Northern Alliance

Division Two table

Stadia and locations

References

External links
 Northern Football League

2022–23
9